Little Big Panda, (German: Kleiner starker Panda) is a 2011 animated children's family film directed by Michael Schoemann. A co-production between China, Germany, France, Spain and Belgium, the film was released in China on February 3, 2011.

Storyline 
Somewhere in the majestic Chinese highlands of our days: The Pandas' survival is severely endangered as the bamboo is becoming scarce, and humans continuously expand into their habitat. And laziness being one of the Pandas' most significant character traits, what the community now requires is someone to rouse them. Manchu, with the help of his friends, stands up to all the trials. The group has nearly reached their destination when suddenly the humans unleash the floods of their newly built dam, aimed at the Pandas' valley!

Cast
Chinese version:
He Jiong
Dinan Chen
Xie Na
Weijia Li
Du Haitao
Liu Chunyan
Jing Li
Zhao Zhongxiang
Yang Li
Banyu Shi
Qiaosheng Han
Huang Jianxiang
彩虹
Weizhi Zhao
Wu Xin
German version:
Anna Thalbach as Frau Cheng
Rainer Gerlach as Ying
David Kunze as Manchu
Santiago Ziesmer as Konfusius
Vivien Gilbert as Chi Chi
Friedel Morgenstern as Jung Fu
English Version:
Karen Strassman as Manchu
Sam Riegel as Kung Fucios 
Cristina Vee as Yung Fu
Alex Ryan as Ying
Paige B. Franklin as Mama Chu
Jessica Straus as Chi Chi
Jessica Gee as Lung Fu
Brent Henry as Buddha Bear
Wendee Lee as Mrs. Cheng
Michael McConnohie as Mr. Teng
Max Moran as Hoo Hoo
Travis Willingham as Brutas
Joe Cooker as Tyson
Barbara Goodson as Additional Voices
Grant George as Additional Voices
Mari Devon as Additional Voices
Steve Kramer as Additional Voices
Steve Pinto as Additional Voices

Reception
The film earned  at the Chinese box office.

References

External links

Chinese animated films
German animated films
Spanish animated films
Belgian animated films
2011 animated films
2011 films
2010s French animated films
Chinese children's films
German children's films
French children's films
Spanish children's films
Belgian children's films
China Film Group Corporation films
Films about giant pandas
Films set in China
Fictional pandas
2010s children's animated films
2010s German films